The Fresquel Aqueduct is one of several aqueducts on the Canal du Midi.  Until its building, the canal crossed the River Fresquel on the level. Built in 1802–1810, the structure is near Carcassonne. It was built when the canal was rerouted to pass through Carcassonne.

See also
Locks on the Canal du Midi

References

External links
Photo

Aqueducts on Canal du Midi